Augustin Gretillat (March 16, 1837 at Fontainemelon – January 14, 1894 in Neuchâtel) was a Swiss Protestant pastor, theologian and professor of theology. He is the author of a “Systematic Theology”, of which four volumes appeared from 1885 to 1892, and he left unfinished a treatise on Christian morality which was to consist of three volumes. He succeeds John Calvin and Bénédict Pictet in the very short list of authors of complete treatises on dogmatic in the French language.

Biography 
He studied theology in Neuchâtel, Halle, Göttingen and Tübingen. He was ordained in 1859 by Frédéric Godet. He was a deacon in La Chaux-de-Fonds from 1860 to 1862. He was a pastor at Couvet from 1862 to 1870. He has been a professor of systematic theology at the University of Neuchâtel since 1870, and then at the Faculty of the Independent Church of 1873 to 1894. He was Chaplain of the Landeron from 1870 to 1894. He was a contributor to the Revue de théologie et de philosophie and foreign journals, including the Revue de théologie de Montauban, Theological Journal (London) and the Presbyterian and Reformed Review (Philadelphia).

Theology

Critic of predestination
Although he was both reformed and evangelical, Augustin Gretillat was nonetheless a vigorous critic of double predestination. Not only did he join in the great Reformed theologians like Philippe Mélanchthon, Moïse Amyrault or Jacobus Arminius, but he also took up the positions of the majority of the non-liberal Reformed theologians of his time, starting with by his teacher Frédéric Godet. On this subject, Gretillat writes for example in his Systematic Theology:

The doctrine of predestination has presented the most strange and contradictory phenomena over the centuries. Considered in itself, in its motives and in its conclusions, it was the most daring challenge to reason and human conscience; an aberration of the Christian genius to which it will always be astonishing that the cause of divine truth could have survived on earth. And this doctrine, which made God a liar and the author of sin, has not less marked the great awakenings and the great regenerations of the Church.

In this regard, neo-calvinist Henri Blocher notes that Gretillat leaned toward Arminianism:

Augustin Gretillat, the last author close to orthodoxy who left a Systematic Theology in French, strongly affirms his Arminianism: the particular predestination is conditional, "relative to the acts of the human will"; "This human conditionality, in fact, is realized in two opposite alternatives, both precognized and not predetermined, which are designated in Scripture by the terms of faith and unbelief."

Assessment and legacy 
With regard to his main work in systematic theology (1885-1892), his friend, the writer Philippe Godet states:
The value [of] the lessons [of Gretillat] can be measured by the great work that has produced. The exposition of Systematic Theology, of which four volumes were published from 1885 to 1892, was to be completed by three volumes of morality; at the moment of his death he had just finished the first. This vast monument, conceived according to a completely personal plan, is the first complete treatise of dogmatics which has appeared in French since Calvin, or at least since the Christian Theology of Benedict Pictet (1708).

Publications

Books

Articles, sermons and conferences 

.

.

Notes and references

Citations

Sources 

1837 births
1894 deaths
19th-century Protestant theologians
Swiss Protestant theologians
Swiss Protestant ministers
Systematic theologians
University of Neuchâtel alumni
Academic staff of the University of Neuchâtel